St. Moluag's Cathedral is located on the Scottish island of Lismore just off the coast of Oban. As a congregation of the Church of Scotland, which is Presbyterian, the present-day parish church of 1749 stands on the site of the choir of the abandoned 13th-century cathedral, incorporating much of its material, but wrapped in 18th-century design.

History

Saint Moluag (Old Irish Mo-Luóc) (d. 592), founded a monastery on the island. It was a major centre of Christianity in Scotland, and the seat of the later medieval bishopric of Argyll or the Isles. To modern eyes it seems an isolated location for such a centre, but in an era when the fastest and most reliable transport was by water, Lismore was ideally situated.

The Diocese of Argyll was Scotland's most impoverished diocese, and the fourteenth century Cathedral was very modest in scale. In 1749, the choir was converted to a parish church. For this purpose, the building was lowered and got new windows. The nave and western tower of the cathedral were reduced to their foundations. The chief surviving medieval features are three doorways, one blocked, another originally the entrance through the pulpitum, a piscina and the triple-arched sedilia. Several late medieval grave slabs are preserved in the church or adjoining graveyard.

Parish
The building is in use as the parish church of Lismore, a congregation of the Church of Scotland. It is also linked with Appin Parish Church on the mainland. The minister. is Rev Dr Iain Barclay ; previous minister is Rev Roderick D. M. Campbell, formerly of St Andrew's and St George's Church in Edinburgh;

See also
List of Church of Scotland parishes

References

External links

 Isle of Lismore site

14th-century church buildings in Scotland
Cathedrals of the Church of Scotland
Church of Scotland churches in Scotland
Lismore, Scotland
Medieval cathedrals in Scotland
Churches in Argyll and Bute
Category B listed buildings in Argyll and Bute
Listed cathedrals in Scotland